"You Turn Me On (Turn On Song)" is a 1965 single by Ian Whitcomb and Bluesville, written by Ian Whitcomb.

Background
The song is noticeable for Whitcomb's falsetto and "orgasmic vocal hook". Whitcomb recorded this song with his band, Bluesville.  The hit version is edited; the original single as recorded was over 3 minutes and had a longer intro during which a mike stand can be clearly heard falling into a studio wall and it had a cold ("stinger") ending. The band Bluesville featured Mick Molloy on lead guitar, Deke O'Brien on Rhythm Guitar, Brian Lynch on bass, Ian McGarry on drums and Pete Adler and Barry Richardson on saxophones.

Chart performance
As part of the British Invasion, "You Turn Me On" reached number 8 on the Billboard Hot 100 chart in the U.S. and number 30 in Canada.

Cover versions
American actress and singer Mae West recorded a cover of the song for her 1966 album Way Out West.
American dance music singer Crystal Waters covered the song for the soundtrack of the 1992 film Encino Man.

References

1965 songs
British rock-and-roll songs
1965 singles
Crystal Waters songs